Insomnia is an extended play by The Hiatus released on November 18, 2009.

This EP was produced by Takeshi Hosomi and Hirohisa Horie. All the lyrics were written by Hosomi but the music was composed by all of the members; Seigen Tokuzawa arranged the string section of Insomnia. The record jacket was designed by Balcolony and Admir Jahic drew the cover art.

Track listing

Recording members 
 Takeshi Hosomi: vocal (all songs), guitar (track 1, 2)
 masasucks: guitar (all songs)
 Koji Ueno: bass guitar (all songs)
 Takashi Kashikura: drums, programming (all songs)
 Masakazu Ichise: drums, percussions (track 3)
 Hirohisa Horie: electronic keyboard (all songs), synthesizer (track 3)
 Ichiyo Izawa: piano (track 3)
 Seigen Tokuzawa: string instruments (track 1)

2009 EPs
The Hiatus albums